The Panics are an indie rock band originally from Perth, Western Australia, and currently based in Melbourne, Victoria.

History

2000–2006: Band formation and LittleBigMan Records
The band started out while Jae Laffer (then known by his actual first name, Justin) and Drew Wootton were still at high school in Kalamunda, an outer suburb of Perth, Western Australia. Laffer and Wootton met on their first day of school. The duo added Drew's younger brother Myles on drums, Paul Otway on bass and Jules Douglas on slide guitar, keyboards and vocals and formed The Panics.

After being spotted playing at the Inglewood Hotel by Happy Mondays' Gaz Whelan and Pete Carroll, following Happy Mondays' Perth performance at The Big Day Out in 2000, they were the first signing to the UK-based label LittleBIGMAN Records.

Laffer later said "That's what's been really cool about us and the label is that it was just the fact it was new for everyone and we weren't just another band that they were adding to their roster. It felt really exciting to be part of a label that seemed to have really good ideals and be run by guys who certainly have their heads in the right place and are pro-artist as opposed to pro-money and I truly believe that."

The Panics first release was a self-titled EP in January 2002. Tracks "My Brilliant Career" and "Give Me Some Good Luck" enjoyed high rotation on Australian radio station Triple J A second EP was released in 2002 and tracks "This Day Last Year" and "How's It Feel" were also played on Triple J. In 2002, The Panics were the first Australian band to be invited to play at In the City, the UK's annual music convention. Laffer said "It was just a very spooky event. It was like playing a pub in Perth. It was condensed down to a couple of nights. In this one kind of block in Salford in Manchester there was about ten pubs all within walking distance, each with about five bands playing a night and just a huge huge amount of industry just doing the rounds, walking through. Every person in the crowd had a laminate. Our place was packed when we played which was great but it’s very hard to read industry people 'cause they don’t want to jump around and cheer. We’d just finished recording and I remember being on stage and we were just having a laugh because it was just so great to be playing in England."

While in England they commenced recording tracks for their debut album. A House on a Street in a Town I'm From was released in 2003 to local critical praise and included the single "Kid You're a Dreamer", which was used as the credits theme music for the Australian drama The Surgeon on Network Ten. The band toured Australia for the first time and also played a series of gigs with Morrissey, Gomez, Grandaddy, The Church and Badly Drawn Boy. They went on to complete several sell out national headline tours of Australia..

In late 2004, the band headed back to England for a second UK tour, including supporting the Happy Mondays at a sold-out show to over 12,000 people on Clapham Common in London. Whilst in Manchester, they commenced writing new material for their next album,

The band's second album, Sleeps Like a Curse was released in August 2005, and was nominated for the Triple J Australian Album of the Year. Shortly after the release of the album, the band relocated to Melbourne.

In October 2006 they released a three track single "Factory Girl", a cover of the Rolling Stones' "Factory Girl" from their 1968 album, Beggars Banquet.

2007–2010: Dew Process and Cruel Guards
In February 2007 The Panics signed with Dew Process, and on 13 October 2007, the band released their third studio album, Cruel Guards which peaked at number 18 on the ARIA Charts and was certified gold. The album was Triple J's feature album for the week of 8 October 2007 and went on to win the 2007 J Award for Triple J Australian Album of the Year.

The album's lead single "Don't Fight It" was released in August 2007 was featured in an episode of the Australian television drama series, Underbelly and appears on the soundtrack album. It was also used for the end scene of the Ugly Betty episode, "Tornado Girl". The song became the band's first to reach the ARIA top 50, peaking at number 43

At the ARIA Music Awards of 2008, the band were nominated for four awards, winning the ARIA Award for Best Adult Contemporary Album. Jae Laffer said "We like to consider ourselves a bit more contemporary than adult, but we'll take that." He Added "The award was nice recognition after seven years together as a band. It's almost like just a bit of validation for a lot of hard work. Also it keeps the band a little bit hungry just knowing that people are listening."

In early 2010, The Panics played a show at Kings Park, Perth backed by the West Australian Symphony Orchestra. The orchestra features many performers not unaccustomed to this form of cross-over with many, notably Michael Ingle, having previously played with Ben Lee and The Cat Empire.

The band contributed the song "No More Tears" on the Maurice Frawley 2010 tribute album, Long Gone Whistle - The Songs of Maurice Frawley.

2011–present: Rain on the Humming Wire and Hole in Your Pocket
On 29 July 2011, the band released their fourth studio album Rain on the Humming Wire, which peaked at number 7 on the ARIA Charts, becoming their first top ten album. At the ARIA Music Awards of 2011, the album was nominated for ARIA Award for Best Adult Alternative Album.
 
In 2013, The Panics were commissioned to write an original soundtrack for the ABC archival documentary Girt by Sea (2014). The film premiered at the Perth International Arts Festival in February 2014 where The Panics performed the score live to a sold-out audience.

Before recording their next album, the band had some time off with Laffer saying in 2016 "The members felt as though they were running low on steam, unable to produce much fruitful work." On 7 October 2016, the band released their fifth studio album Hole in Your Pocket. Upon release, lead singer Jae Laffer spoke with Double J saying there is a "beauty of making a record after a significant break [as] you've evolved as a person from when you were writing your last batch of songs", adding "You experience some new things that you haven't touched on before, musically and lyrically." Despite positive reviews, the album peaked at number 52 on the ARIA Chart.

Commencing fortnightly in April 2020, the band re-released their back catalogue on streaming services.

Members
 Jae Laffer – vocals, guitar, keyboards
 Drew Wootton – guitar
 Myles Wootton – drums
 Paul Otway – bass
 Jules Douglas – keyboard, guitar, vocals

Discography

Studio albums

Extended plays

Singles

Awards and nominations

ARIA Music Awards
The ARIA Music Awards is an annual awards ceremony that recognises excellence, innovation, and achievement across all genres of Australian music. The Panics has won 1 award from 5 nominations.

|-
| rowspan="4"| 2008
| Cruel Guards
| Best Adult Contemporary Album
| 
|-
| rowspan="2"| Scott Horscroft for Cruel Guards
| Producer of the Year
| 
|-
| Engineer of the Year
| 
|-
| "Don't Fight It"
| ARIA Award for Breakthrough Single
| 
|-
| 2011
| Rain on the Hummingwire
| Best Adult Alternative Album
| 
|-

The J Awards
The J Awards are an annual series of Australian music awards that were established by the Australian Broadcasting Corporation's youth-focused radio station Triple J, and judged by on-air teams at the station.

|-
| J Award of 2005
| Sleeps Like a Curse
| Triple J Australian Album of the Year
| 
|-
| J Awards of 2007
| Cruel Guards
| Triple J Australian Album of the Year
| 
|-

WAMI Awards
The Western Australian Music Industry Awards (commonly known as WAMis) are annual awards presented to the local contemporary music industry, put on by the Western Australian Music Industry Association Inc (WAM) and celebrates achievements of Western Australian artists.

|-
| rowspan="2"| 2002
| The Panics (EP 1)
| Most Popular Local Original Single/EP
| 
|-
| themselves 
| Most Popular New Band
| 
|-
| 2003
| themselves 
| Most Popular Local Original Act 
| 
|-
| rowspan="4"| 2008
| themselves 
| Most Popular Act
| 
|-
| themselves 
| Best Commercial Pop Act
| 
|-
| Cruel Guards
| Most Popular Album
| 
|-

References

Australian indie rock groups
Western Australian musical groups
Musical groups established in 2000
ARIA Award winners
2000 establishments in Australia
Dew Process artists